Hyalurga rufilinea is a moth of the family Erebidae. It was described by Francis Walker in 1865. It is found in Brazil.

References

 

Hyalurga
Moths described in 1865